Turan Mirzayev (born September 24, 1979 in Lankaran) is an Azerbaijani weightlifter. He is a three-time Olympian and a two-time medalist for the 69 kg class at the European Weightlifting Championships (2001 in Trenčín, Slovakia, and 2003 in Loutraki, Greece).

Mirzayev made his official debut for the 2000 Summer Olympics in Sydney, where he hauled 327.5 kilograms in total for a ninth-place finish in the men's lightweight class (69 kg). Following his further successes from the European Championships, Mirzayev was considered a top medal contender for his division at the 2004 Summer Olympics in Athens. Unfortunately, he missed out his Olympic medal shot when he lifted a total of 332.5 kg in the 69 kg category, finishing only in fourth place by five kilograms short of Croatia's Nikolaj Pešalov (337.5 kg).

At the 2008 Summer Olympics in Beijing, Mirzayev competed for his third consecutive time in the men's 69 kg class, along with his fellow weightlifter Afgan Bayramov. Mirzayev placed fifth in this event, as he successfully lifted 146 kg in the single-motion snatch, and hoisted 181 kg in the two-part, shoulder-to-overhead clean and jerk, for a total of 327 kg.

References

External links
NBC 2008 Olympics profile

Azerbaijani male weightlifters
1979 births
Living people
Olympic weightlifters of Azerbaijan
Weightlifters at the 2000 Summer Olympics
Weightlifters at the 2004 Summer Olympics
Weightlifters at the 2008 Summer Olympics
People from Lankaran
European Weightlifting Championships medalists
World Weightlifting Championships medalists
20th-century Azerbaijani people
21st-century Azerbaijani people